A garment is an article of clothing.

Garment may also refer to:

Garment District (disambiguation)
Temple garment, a type of underwear worn by adherents of the Latter Day Saint movement after they have taken part in the endowment ceremony.

People with the surname
Leonard Garment (1924–2013), American lawyer and arts advocate